The 2018 Auto Club 400 was a Monster Energy NASCAR Cup Series race that was held on March 18, 2018, at Auto Club Speedway in Fontana, California. Contested over 200 laps on the  D-shaped oval, it was the fifth race of the 2018 Monster Energy NASCAR Cup Series season.

Report

Background

It is also used for open wheel racing events. The racetrack is located near the former locations of Ontario Motor Speedway and Riverside International Raceway. The track is owned and operated by International Speedway Corporation and is the only track owned by ISC to have naming rights sold. The speedway is served by the nearby Interstate 10 and Interstate 15 freeways as well as a Metrolink station located behind the backstretch.

Entry list

First practice

Qualifying

Qualifying results

Practice (post-qualifying)

Second practice

Final practice

Race

Stage 1 
Martin Truex Jr. led the field to the green flag at 3:46 p.m. Winner of three consecutive Cup races, Kevin Harvick was shooting for a higher spot in history with a fourth Sunday, but that march ended early in the race when he collided with Kyle Larson on the backstretch, bringing out the first caution on lap 39. They were running side by side when Harvick appeared to move down the track and into the side of Larson’s car. The impact sent Harvick’s car into the outside wall, causing heavy damage.

The race restarted on lap 43.

Martin Truex Jr., master of stage wins last season, scored his first of the new year, leading Kyle Busch by 3.5 seconds. Also in the top 10 were Joey Logano, Brad Keselowski, Jimmie Johnson, Kyle Larson, Kurt Busch, Erik Jones, Clint Bowyer and Denny Hamlin. The second caution of the race flew on lap 62 for the conclusion of the first stage.

Stage 2 
The race restarted on lap 67.

Trevor Bayne slapped the outside wall after slight contact with Ryan Newman. The incident produced the race’s third caution of the race, which was on lap 109. Bayne called his meeting with the wall one of the hardest of his career.

The race restarted on lap 114.

Truex scored again at the end of stage two, leading Brad Keselowski by 1.8 seconds. Following were Kyle Busch, Denny Hamlin, Erik Jones, Joey Logano, Jimmie Johnson, Kyle Larson, Clint Bowyer and William Byron. The fourth caution of the race flew on lap 122 for conclusion of stage 2.

Final stage 

The race restarted on lap 127.

The fifth caution of the race flew on lap 130 when David Ragan spun out in turn 2, so Ty Dillon won the free pass under caution.

The race restarted on lap 132.

The closing portion of the race featured a battle for the lead matching Martin Truex Jr., Kyle Busch and Kyle Larson. With 18 laps to go, Truex had a five-second lead over Busch and Larson, who were fighting for second.

Martin Truex Jr., last year’s Cup champion, returned to victory lane — a place he visited eight times in 2017 — and, at the same time, dropped Kevin Harvick’s name from NASCAR’s marquee. At least temporarily.

Post race 
“This is a reassurance that what we’re doing is working,” Truex said. “It just feels good to win. I don't really worry about who's winning or who else is fast. Obviously, the 4 (Harvick) has been quick and they have a great team. But, as we’ve seen today, we can put together a run like that, as well.

“It feels good to be able to find that speed.”

Stage Results

Stage 1
Laps: 60

Stage 2
Laps: 60

Final Stage Results

Stage 3
Laps: 80

Race statistics
 Lead changes: 7 among different drivers
 Cautions/Laps: 5 for 21
 Red flags: 0
 Time of race: 2 hours, 42 minutes and 41 seconds
 Average speed:

Media

Television
The race was the 18th race Fox Sports covered at the Auto Club Speedway. Mike Joy, three-time Auto Club winner Jeff Gordon and Darrell Waltrip had call in the booth for the race. Jamie Little, Vince Welch and Matt Yocum handled the pit road duties for the television side.

Radio
MRN had the radio call for the race which was also simulcasted on Sirius XM NASCAR Radio. Joe Moore, Jeff Striegle and 2001 race winner Rusty Wallace called the race from the booth when the field was racing down the front stretch. Dan Hubbard called race from a billboard outside turn 2 when the field was racing through turns 1 and 2. Kurt Becker called the race from a billboard outside turn 3 when the field was racing through turns 3 and 4. Alex Hayden, Winston Kelley and Steve Post worked pit road for MRN.

Standings after the race

Drivers' Championship standings

Manufacturers' Championship standings

Note: Only the first 16 positions are included for the driver standings.

References

Auto Club 400
Auto Club 400
Auto Club 400
NASCAR races at Auto Club Speedway